Santa Vittoria d'Alba is a comune (municipality) in the Province of Cuneo in the Italian region Piedmont, located about  southeast of Turin and about 45 kilometres northeast of Cuneo.

Santa Vittoria d'Alba borders the following municipalities: Bra, Monticello d'Alba, Pocapaglia, Roddi, and Verduno.

Demographic evolution

Twin towns — sister cities
Santa Vittoria d'Alba is twinned with:

  Vers-Pont-du-Gard, France (1973)

References

Roero
Cities and towns in Piedmont